Wayne Truter (born 27 June 1965) is a South African cricketer. He played in 58 first-class and 55 List A matches for Boland from 1987/88 to 1996/97.

See also
 List of Boland representative cricketers

References

External links
 

1965 births
Living people
South African cricketers
Boland cricketers
Cricketers from Cape Town